Petrochemicals (sometimes abbreviated as petchems) are the chemical products obtained from petroleum by refining. Some chemical compounds made from petroleum are also obtained from other fossil fuels, such as coal or natural gas, or renewable sources such as maize, palm fruit or sugar cane.

The two most common petrochemical classes are olefins (including ethylene and propylene) and aromatics (including benzene, toluene and xylene isomers).

Oil refineries produce olefins and aromatics by fluid catalytic cracking of petroleum fractions. Chemical plants produce olefins by steam cracking of natural gas liquids like ethane and propane. Aromatics are produced by catalytic reforming of naphtha. Olefins and aromatics are the building-blocks for a wide range of materials such as solvents, detergents, and adhesives. Olefins are the basis for polymers and oligomers used in plastics, resins, fibers, elastomers, lubricants, and gels.

Global ethylene production was 190 million tonnes and propylene was 120 million tonnes in 2019. Aromatics production is approximately 70 million tonnes. The largest petrochemical industries are located in the USA and Western Europe; however, major growth in new production capacity is in the Middle East and Asia. There is substantial inter-regional petrochemical trade.

Primary petrochemicals are divided into three groups depending on their chemical structure:

 Olefins includes ethene, propene, butenes and butadiene. Ethylene and propylene are important sources of industrial chemicals and plastics products. Butadiene is used in making synthetic rubber.
 Aromatics includes benzene, toluene and xylenes, as a whole referred to as BTX and primarily obtained from petroleum refineries by extraction from the reformate produced in catalytic reformers using naphtha obtained from petroleum refineries. Alternatively, BTX can be produced by aromatization of alkanes. Benzene is a raw material for dyes and synthetic detergents, and benzene and toluene for isocyanates MDI and TDI used in making polyurethanes. Manufacturers use xylenes to produce plastics and synthetic fibers.
 Synthesis gas is a mixture of carbon monoxide and hydrogen used to produce methanol and other chemicals. Steam crackers are not to be confused with steam reforming plants used to produce hydrogen for ammonia production. Ammonia is used to make the fertilizer urea and methanol is used as a solvent and chemical intermediate. 
 Methane, ethane, propane and butanes obtained primarily from natural gas processing plants.
 Methanol and formaldehyde.

In 2007, the amounts of ethylene and propylene produced in steam crackers were about 115 Mt (megatonnes) and 70 Mt, respectively. The output ethylene capacity of large steam crackers ranged up to as much as 1.0 – 1.5 Mt per year.

The adjacent diagram schematically depicts the major hydrocarbon sources and processes used in producing petrochemicals.

Like commodity chemicals, petrochemicals are made on a very large scale. Petrochemical manufacturing units differ from commodity chemical plants in that they often produce a number of related products. Compare this with specialty chemical and fine chemical manufacture where products are made in discrete batch processes.

Petrochemicals are predominantly made in a few manufacturing locations around the world, for example in Jubail & Yanbu Industrial Cities in Saudi Arabia, Texas & Louisiana in the US, in Teesside in the Northeast of England in the United Kingdom, in Rotterdam in the Netherlands, in Jamnagar, Dahej in Gujarat, India and in Singapore. Not all of the petrochemical or commodity chemical materials produced by the chemical industry are made in one single location but groups of related materials are often made in adjacent manufacturing plants to induce industrial symbiosis as well as material and utility efficiency and other economies of scale. This is known in chemical engineering terminology as integrated manufacturing. Specialty and fine chemical companies are sometimes found in similar manufacturing locations as petrochemicals but, in most cases, they do not need the same level of large-scale infrastructure (e.g., pipelines, storage, ports, and power, etc.) and therefore can be found in multi-sector business parks.

The large-scale petrochemical manufacturing locations have clusters of manufacturing units that share utilities and large-scale infrastructures such as power stations, storage tanks, port facilities, road and rail terminals. In the United Kingdom, for example, there are 4 main locations for such manufacturing: near the River Mersey in North West England, on the Humber on the East coast of Yorkshire, in Grangemouth near the Firth of Forth in Scotland, and in Teesside as part of the Northeast of England Process Industry Cluster (NEPIC). To demonstrate the clustering and integration, some 50% of the United Kingdom's petrochemical and commodity chemicals are produced by the NEPIC industry cluster companies in Teesside.

History 
In 1835, Henri Victor Regnault, a French chemist left vinyl chloride in the sun and found white solid at the bottom of the flask which was polyvinyl chloride. In 1839, Eduard Simon discovered polystyrene by accident by distilling storax. In 1856, William Henry Perkin discovered the first synthetic dye, Mauveine. In 1888, Friedrich Reinitzer, an Austrian plant scientist observed cholesteryl benzoate had two different melting points. In 1909, Leo Hendrik Baekeland invented bakelite made from phenol and formaldehyde. In 1928, synthetic fuels were invented using Fischer-Tropsch process. In 1929, Walter Bock invented synthetic rubber Buna-S which is made up of styrene and butadiene and used to make car tires. In 1933, Otto Röhm polymerized the first acrylic glass methyl methacrylate. In 1935, Michael Perrin invented polyethylene. In 1937, Wallace Hume Carothers invented nylon. In 1938, Otto Bayer invented polyurethane. In 1941, Roy Plunkett invented Teflon. In 1946, he invented Polyester. Polyethylene terephthalate (PET) bottles are made from ethylene and paraxylene. In 1949, Fritz Stastny turned polystyrene into foam. After World War II, polypropylene was discovered in the early 1950s. In 1965, Stephanie Kwolek invented Kevlar.

Olefins 

The following is a partial list of major commercial petrochemicals and their derivatives:

 ethylene – the simplest olefin; used as a chemical feedstock and ripening stimulant
polyethylene – polymerized ethylene; LDPE, HDPE, LLDPE
ethanol – via ethylene hydration (chemical reaction adding water) of ethylene
 ethylene oxide – via ethylene oxidation
 ethylene glycol – via ethylene oxide hydration
 engine coolant – ethylene glycol, water and inhibitor mixture
 polyesters – any of several polymers with ester linkages in the main chain
 glycol ethers – via glycol condescension
 ethoxylates
 vinyl acetate
 1,2-dichloroethane
 trichloroethylene
 tetrachloroethylene – also called perchloroethylene; used as a dry cleaning solvent and degreaser
 vinyl chloride – monomer for polyvinyl chloride
 polyvinyl chloride (PVC) – a type of plastic used for piping, tubing, other things

 propylene – used as a monomer and a chemical feedstock
isopropyl alcohol – 2-propanol; often used as a solvent or rubbing alcohol
 acrylonitrile – useful as a monomer in forming Orlon, ABS
 polypropylene – polymerized propylene
 propylene oxide
polyether polyol – used in the production of polyurethanes
propylene glycol – used in engine coolant  and aircraft deicer fluid
glycol ethers – from the condensation of glycols
 acrylic acid
acrylic polymers
 allyl chloride
 epichlorohydrin – chloro-oxirane; used in epoxy resin formation
 epoxy resins – a type of polymerizing glue from bisphenol A, epichlorohydrin, and some amine
butene
 isomers of butylene – useful as monomers or co-monomers
 isobutylene – feed for making methyl tert-butyl ether (MTBE) or monomer for copolymerization with a low percentage of isoprene to make butyl rubber
 1,3-butadiene (or buta-1,3-diene) – a diene often used as a monomer or co-monomer for polymerization to elastomers such as polybutadiene, styrene-butadiene rubber, or a plastic such as acrylonitrile-butadiene-styrene (ABS)
 synthetic rubbers – synthetic elastomers made of any one or more of several petrochemical (usually) monomers such as 1,3-butadiene, styrene, isobutylene, isoprene, chloroprene; elastomeric polymers are often made with a high percentage of conjugated diene monomers such as 1,3-butadiene, isoprene, or chloroprene
 higher olefins
polyolefins – such poly-alpha-olefins, which are used as lubricants
 alpha-olefins – used as monomers, co-monomers, and other chemical precursors.  For example, a small amount of 1-hexene can be copolymerized with ethylene into a more flexible form of polyethylene.
 other higher olefins
 detergent alcohols

Aromatics 

benzene – the simplest aromatic hydrocarbon
ethylbenzene – made from benzene and ethylene
 styrene – made by dehydrogenation of ethylbenzene; used as a monomer
 polystyrenes – polymers with styrene as a monomer
 cumene – isopropylbenzene; a feedstock in the cumene process
 phenol – hydroxybenzene; often made by the cumene process
 acetone – dimethyl ketone; also often made by the cumene process
 bisphenol A – a type of "double" phenol used in polymerization in epoxy resins and making a common type of polycarbonate
 epoxy resins – a type of polymerizing glue from bisphenol A, epichlorohydrin, and some amine
 polycarbonate – a plastic polymer made from bisphenol A and phosgene (carbonyl dichloride)
 solvents – liquids used for dissolving materials; examples often made from petrochemicals include ethanol, isopropyl alcohol, acetone, benzene, toluene, xylenes
 cyclohexane – a 6-carbon aliphatic cyclic hydrocarbon sometimes used as a non-polar solvent
 adipic acid – a 6-carbon dicarboxylic acid, which can be a precursor used as a co-monomer together with a diamine to form an alternating copolymer form of nylon.
 nylons – types of polyamides, some are alternating copolymers formed from copolymerizing dicarboxylic acid or derivatives with diamines
 caprolactam – a 6-carbon cyclic amide
 nylons – types of polyamides, some are from polymerizing caprolactam
 nitrobenzene – can be made by single nitration of benzene
 aniline – aminobenzene
 methylene diphenyl diisocyanate (MDI) – used as a co-monomer with diols or polyols to form polyurethanes or with di- or polyamines to form polyureas
 alkylbenzene – a general type of aromatic hydrocarbon, which can be used as a precursor for a sulfonate surfactant (detergent)
detergents – often include surfactants types such as alkylbenzene sulfonates and nonylphenol ethoxylates
 chlorobenzene

 toluene – methylbenzene; can be a solvent or precursor for other chemicals
 benzene
 toluene diisocyanate (TDI) – used as co-monomers with polyether polyols to form polyurethanes or with di- or polyamines to form polyureas polyurethanes
 benzoic acid – carboxybenzene
 caprolactam

 mixed xylenes – any of three dimethylbenzene isomers, could be a solvent but more often precursor chemicals
 ortho-xylene – both methyl groups can be oxidized to form (ortho-)phthalic acid
 phthalic anhydride
 para-xylene – both methyl groups can be oxidized to form terephthalic acid
 dimethyl terephthalate – can be copolymerized to form certain polyesters
 polyesters – although there can be many types, polyethylene terephthalate is made from petrochemical products and is very widely used in petrol stations 
 purified terephthalic acid – often copolymerized to form polyethylene terephthalate
 polyesters
 meta-xylene
 isophthalic acid
 alkyd resins
 polyamide resins
 unsaturated polyesters

List of petrochemicals

See also
Petroleum
Petroleum products
Instrumentation in petrochemical industries
Organization of the Petroleum Exporting Countries
Asia Petrochemical Industry Conference (APIC)
Northeast of England Process Industry Cluster (NEPIC)

References

External links

 
